Edward Leech may refer to:

Edward Leech (MP) (1572–1652), English politician
Edward O. Leech (1850–1900), director of the United States Mint

See also
Edward Leach (disambiguation)